A mojito is a Cuban rum-based cocktail.

Mojito may also refer to:

 Mojito (framework), a model-view-controller (MVC) web application framework
 Mojito, New Jersey, a temporary name for the community of Richland, New Jersey
 Mojito, a variant of mojo sauce
 Mojito, a Kademlia-based DHT to find sources on the Gnutella network
 "Mojito" (song), a 2021 song by Thalía
 "Mojito", a 2017 song by Red Velvet from The Red Summer
 "Mojito", a 2020 song by Jay Chou
 Aprilia Mojito, a scooter model